Anastasiya Vladimirovna Kuzmina (née Shipulina; born 28 August 1984) is a retired Russian-born Slovak biathlete.

Career
Kuzmina represented Slovakia from December 2008 and won the silver medal two months later in mass start at the 2009 Biathlon World Championships in Pyeongchang. She won a gold medal in the 7.5 km sprint and a silver medal in the 10 km pursuit at the 2010 Winter Olympics in Vancouver, British Columbia, Canada. Kuzmina's victory made her the second Slovak after Ondrej Nepela to win a Winter Olympic gold medal, and the first for independent Slovakia. She won another medal – bronze, at the 2011 Biathlon World Championships in Khanty-Mansiysk.  At the 2014 Winter Olympics, she again won the gold medal in the 7.5 km sprint. At the 2018 Winter Olympics, she took silver medals in the pursuit and the individual before taking the gold in the mass start, hitting 19 out of 20 targets to become the first biathlete to win gold medals in three consecutive Games, and tying her as the Slovak sportsperson with the most Olympic golds alongside canoeists Pavol and Peter Hochschorner.

In the 2017–18 season she took her first discipline World Cup titles, winning the Crystal Globes for the sprint and pursuit disciplines. She also finished the season second in the overall World Cup standings, three points behind champion Kaisa Mäkäräinen.

Her brother Anton Shipulin is a Russian biathlete. Her husband, Daniel Kuzmin, is an Israeli cross-country skier and Kuzmina's personal coach. They have one son, Yelisey, and one daughter, Olivia. She, her husband and their children live in Banská Bystrica, Slovakia. She speaks Russian, Slovak and English.

Biathlon results
All results are sourced from the International Biathlon Union.

Olympic Games
6 medals (3 gold, 3 silver)

Kuzmina has won six medals from Olympic Games. In Vancouver she won a gold medal in the sprint and a silver medal in pursuit and in Sochi she won a gold medal in the 7.5 km sprint, becoming the first woman in biathlon to successfully defend an individual Olympic title. In Pyeongchang she won three medals, gold in the 12.5 km mass start event and silver in the 10 km pursuit and in the 15 km individual race.

*The mixed relay was added as an event in 2014.

World Championships
3 medals (1 gold, 1 silver, 1 bronze)

Kuzmina has won three medals from World Championships. In Pyeonchang she won a silver medal in the 12.5 km mass start. In Khanty-Mansiysk she won a bronze medal in the 7.5 km sprint.

World Cup

Overall record

* Results in IBU World Cup races, Olympics and World Championships.

Individual victories

*Results are from IBU races which include the Biathlon World Cup, Biathlon World Championships and the Winter Olympic Games.

Updated on 25 March 2018

References

External links

 

1984 births
Living people
People from Tyumen
Russian emigrants to Slovakia
Naturalized citizens of Slovakia
Russian female biathletes
Slovak female biathletes
Biathletes at the 2010 Winter Olympics
Biathletes at the 2014 Winter Olympics
Biathletes at the 2018 Winter Olympics
Olympic biathletes of Slovakia
Medalists at the 2010 Winter Olympics
Medalists at the 2014 Winter Olympics
Medalists at the 2018 Winter Olympics
Olympic medalists in biathlon
Olympic silver medalists for Slovakia
Olympic gold medalists for Slovakia
Biathlon World Championships medalists
Holmenkollen Ski Festival winners
Sportspeople from Tyumen Oblast
Naturalised sports competitors